Jesús España Cobo (born 21 August 1978 in Valdemoro, Community of Madrid) is a Spanish long-distance runner, who mostly concentrates on the 3000 and 5000 metres.

España first represented Spain at the 2001 IAAF World Cross Country Championships, where he was 11th in the short race. He won his first medal the following year at the 2002 European Athletics Indoor Championships, taking the bronze medal over 3000 m. Outdoors, he came eleventh in the 5000 m at the 2002 European Athletics Championships. He came close to another medal indoors at the 2003 IAAF World Indoor Championships, finishing a fraction of a second behind the bronze medallist Luke Kipkosgei. In 2005 he won the 3000 m gold medal at the 2005 European Cup and went on to compete at the 2005 World Championships in Athletics, where he was disqualified in the heats.

At the 2006 European Championships in Athletics España gained a narrow win in the 5000 m, overtaking Mo Farah just metres from the line. This was his first major international title. He made his Olympic debut at the 2008 Beijing Olympics, where he finished 14th in the 5000 m final. In 2009 he won the 3000 m bronze at the European Indoors, a gold medal over the distance at the 2009 European Team Championships, and finished tenth in the 5000 m final at the 2009 World Championships in Athletics.

Jesús España competed at the 2010 IAAF World Indoor Championships and came sixth, and retained his title at the 2010 European Team Championships. He attempted to defend his 5000 m title at the 2010 European Athletics Championships, but found himself beaten by Farah on this occasion, ending up with the silver medal. He ran at the San Silvestre Vallecana in Madrid on New Year's Eve and took third place on the podium behind Zersenay Tadese and fellow Spaniard Ayad Lamdassem. He was fifth over 3000 m at the 2011 European Athletics  Indoor Championships in March and won the Great Ireland Run in April.

Achievements

Personal bests
1500 metres – 3:36.53 min (2002)
3000 metres – 7:38.26 min (2006)
5000 metres – 13:04.73 min (2011)
10,000 metres – 28:26.27 min (2012)
Half marathon –  1:03:28 (2016)
Marathon – 2:11:58 (2016)

References

External links



1978 births
Living people
People from Valdemoro
Spanish male middle-distance runners
Spanish male long-distance runners
Spanish male marathon runners
Olympic athletes of Spain
Athletes (track and field) at the 2008 Summer Olympics
Athletes (track and field) at the 2016 Summer Olympics
European Athletics Championships medalists
World Athletics Championships athletes for Spain
Athletes from the Community of Madrid